Ramūnas Vyšniauskas (born September 23, 1976 in Klaipėda) is a retired weightlifter from Lithuania. He competed in the 105 kg class.

Results

Doping 
In 1997 Vyšniauskas was disqualified for two years due to a positive doping test. In 2014 Vyšniauskas was disqualified again due to a positive doping test. in 2020 Vyšniauskas who already finished his weightlifter career, but worked as weightlifting coach was disqualified for eight years 
for having and for possibility of distributing doping substances.

References

Lithuanian male weightlifters
Living people
1976 births
Weightlifters at the 1996 Summer Olympics
Weightlifters at the 2000 Summer Olympics
Weightlifters at the 2004 Summer Olympics
Weightlifters at the 2008 Summer Olympics
Olympic weightlifters of Lithuania
Lithuanian television presenters
Sportspeople from Klaipėda
Lithuanian sportspeople in doping cases
Doping cases in weightlifting
European Weightlifting Championships medalists
20th-century Lithuanian people
21st-century Lithuanian people